Ruby & Quentin (French: Tais-toi ! (Shut up!) is a 2003 French comedy-crime caper film, directed by Francis Veber. The film became popular in China after being dubbed in Northeastern Mandarin.

Cast

 Jean Reno as Ruby
 Gérard Depardieu as Quentin
 Richard Berry as Vernet
 André Dussollier as The psychiatrist 
 Jean-Pierre Malo as Vogel
 Jean-Michel Noirey as Lambert
 Laurent Gamelon as Mauricet
 Aurélien Recoing as Rocco
 Vincent Moscato as Raffi
 Ticky Holgado as Martineau
 Michel Aumont as Nosberg
 Léonor Varela as Katia/Sandra
 Loïc Brabant as Jambier
 Arnaud Cassand as Bourgoin
 Edgar Givry as Vavinet
 Guy Delamarch as Lefevre
 Rebecca Potok as Madame Lefevre
 Jean Dell as The radiologist
 Guillaume de Tonquédec as The hospital's intern
 Adrien Saint-Joré & Johan Libéreau as Teenagers

Plot
Quentin, a dim-witted small-time thief, holds up a foreign exchange booth. Unable to get the money he wants, he asks for directions to the nearest bank. When the police are given this tip-off, Quentin runs into a cinema where Ice Age is showing. He is caught when instead of continuing to run, he sits down and enjoys the film.

Ruby, a henchman of the crime lord Vogel, who has been having an affair with his boss' wife, is thrown into a jail after getting caught hiding the loot that he stole from his boss in revenge for the death of his lover. In jail Ruby refuses to eat or speak, which concerns the jail's psychiatrist but fails to impress the detective in charge of the investigation, who sees through Ruby's ruse.

At the suggestion of the detective, the two criminals meet after Quentin, an intolerable extrovert who has driven mad two other inmates, is put in with him. Quentin thinks that he has struck up a one-sided friendship with Ruby after conducting an uninteresting monologue, however they are parted again after Ruby fakes suicide to get out. Quentin does the same and ends up in the bed next to Ruby in the infirmary.

Ruby manages to bribe the psychiatrist (who also works for Vogel) into helping him escape the prison. Quentin, however, thwarts the escape and makes his own botched attempt at escape with help from a drunken long-time friend driving a crane. Over the period of the film Vogel's bodyguards tried to catch Ruby three times. After that they stole two cars of Vogel and his bodyguards returned them back. Once outside Ruby is unable to get rid of Quentin, and they both go through many adventures, including robbing a diminutive horse trainer's house, dressing up in Chanel, exchanging clothing with two impertinent youths, stealing a series of police and civilian cars and fixing Ruby's shoulder with a breaking chair, in pursuit of his former partners in crime. And when Quentin tried to steal a car, two policemen noticed them and Ruby was serious wounded.

Sheltering in an abandoned shop, where Quentin plans to make a café business, they meet another homeless woman, who looks like Vogel's former wife. Ruby gives her some money and drops her off at a hotel to stay.

After an exciting car chase where the antagonists are trapped in a traffic jam, they enter the estate of Vogel and in a shoot-out results in an incapacitated Vogel, and Quentin supposedly mortally wounded. Ruby, much to his own surprise as anyone else's, expresses his grief for Quentin, who tricks him into actually opening a café after he recovers.

References

External links

2003 films
2000s French-language films
Films directed by Francis Veber
Films with screenplays by Francis Veber
2000s crime comedy films
French crime comedy films
2003 comedy films
2000s French films